Wade Allison (born October 14, 1997) is a Canadian professional ice hockey right winger currently playing for the  Philadelphia Flyers of the National Hockey League (NHL). Allison was drafted in the second round, 52nd overall, in the 2016 NHL Entry Draft.

Early life 
Allison was born October 14, 1997, on a 200-acre agricultural plot in Myrtle, Manitoba, just outside of Carman. He played two seasons with the Tri-City Storm in the United States Hockey League, and was one of the team members who won the Clark Cup in the 2015–16 USHL season. The next day, Allison was named as the MVP of the Clark Cup Playoffs.

Playing career

Amateur
In 2015, Allison committed to playing NCAA Division I college ice hockey at Western Michigan University. He drew attention in his freshman year in the Broncos program, finishing his season with 29 points on 12 goals and 17 assists, as well as a playoff appearance. On December 9, 2017, Allison netted his second hat trick of the 2017-18 season, becoming one of two NCAA hockey players to score multiple hat tricks that season.

On January 13, 2018, Allison suffered an anterior cruciate ligament injury in a game against St. Cloud State, and did not return to play until midway through his junior year. During the 2019-20 season, Allison was named as an alternate captain for the Broncos. Later that season, Allison suffered a shoulder injury, and only appeared in 26 games, over the course of which he scored 10 goals and 23 points. While the Broncos qualified for the 2020 NCHC Tournament, all playoff games were canceled on March 12, 2020 due to the COVID-19 pandemic.

Professional

Philadelphia Flyers
On June 25, 2016, Allison was selected in the 2nd round of the 2016 NHL Entry Draft, 52nd overall, by the Philadelphia Flyers. He was given the option to begin professional hockey before completing his college career, but elected to continue playing at WMU, citing a desire to monitor his ACL injury, as well as a perceived opportunity to play in the NCAA Division I Men's Ice Hockey Tournament.

On March 27, 2020, the Flyers signed Allison to an entry-level contract. Allison suffered an undisclosed injury during the Flyers training camp and started the 2020-21 season on the injury reserve.

Allison made his NHL debut on April 15, 2021, against the Pittsburgh Penguins. He scored his first goal in the next game, April 17, on Ilya Samsonov of the Washington Capitals.

Playing style 
Allison is considered a power forward, with Colorado College Tigers head coach Mike Haviland comparing his playing style to that of Troy Brouwer. Flyers assistant general manager Brent Flahr has described him as possessing "a great package of size, speed, and skill."

Career statistics

References

External links 
 

1997 births
Living people
Canadian ice hockey right wingers
Lehigh Valley Phantoms players
People from Carman, Manitoba
Philadelphia Flyers draft picks
Philadelphia Flyers players
Tri-City Storm players
Western Michigan Broncos men's ice hockey players